The Restless is a 2021 international co-production drama film directed by Joachim Lafosse, starring Leïla Bekhti and Damien Bonnard. It revolves around Damien and Leïla, a couple in love as they battle with his bipolar disorder. In June 2021, the film was selected to compete for the Palme d'Or at the 2021 Cannes Film Festival.

At the 11th Magritte Awards, The Restless was nominated for six awards, including Best Film and Best Director for Lafosse.

Cast and characters
 Leïla Bekhti as Leïla
 Damien Bonnard as Damien
 Gabriel Merz Chammah as Amine
 Luc Schiltz as bakery customer
 Larisa Faber as bakery owner
 Elsa Rauchs as Anne
 Jules Waringo as Jérôme
 Joël Delsaut as André

Accolades

References

External links
 

2021 films
2021 drama films
2020s French-language films
Belgian drama films
Films directed by Joachim Lafosse
French-language Belgian films